Mic Mac Mall is Atlantic Canada's largest enclosed shopping mall located in the community of Dartmouth, across the harbour from Halifax, Nova Scotia. It is owned and managed by Mic Mac Mall Limited Partnership.

With stores on three levels, Mic Mac Mall is a major shopping destination for the Maritimes and the only location for Decathlon east of Quebec. The mall is located in a suburban area south of Lake Micmac and northwest of the Micmac Parclo interchange. It hosts a Halifax Transit bus terminal.

History
The mall was announced on 13 July 1971 by the developer, Micmac Shopping Centre Limited, which was jointly owned by Simpsons, Eaton's, and a Dartmouth development company called MacCulloch and Company Limited. It was built in Micmac Village, a housing development being constructed by MacCulloch and Co. following the opening of nearby Highway 111. A Sobeys supermarket was initially planned, but Dominion ended up winning the tender to establish a store in the complex. 

Construction was carried out by Robert MacAlpine Ltd. Originally anchored by Simpsons and Eaton's, the mall was completed in 1973 and underwent major expansions in 1978 and 1981. In 1976, Simpsons and MacCulloch jointly bought Eaton's share of the mall, increasing their equity to 50 per cent each.

Simpson's was acquired by the Hudson's Bay Company (HBC) in 1978, and by the mid-1980s, Mic Mac Mall was wholly owned by Markborough Properties, a subsidiary of HBC. In 1996, Markborough sold its interest in the mall to Cambridge Shopping Centres Limited. Ownership passed to the newly formed Ivanhoé Cambridge when Cambridge merged with Ivanhoe Corporation in February 2001.

In June 2018, Ivanhoé Cambridge announced that they planned to spend over $55 million renovating the property. The common areas were extensively refurbished and the food court was renovated. The company sold the property to Halifax developer Joe Ramia and an unnamed group of investors in 2021.

Christmas tree

Over the years, Mic Mac Mall had either delighted or frightened children with a talking Christmas tree named Woody. Woody would be set up in the centre court along with Santa where children would get the chance to talk to him. Woody had become a Christmas tradition at Mic Mac Mall and was around for over 25 years. In 2007, Mic Mac Mall decided to retire Woody due to safety concerns and extensive repairs needed to Woody's frame. 

Following the shopping centre's 2021 sale, the new owners promised to bring Woody back to the mall. On November 19, 2021, Woody returned after a 15-year absence with a makeover to his appearance. Hundreds of people turned up to witness the unveiling of the tree. The tree gained national and international attention after it was shown on the November 23, 2021 episode of The Tonight Show Starring Jimmy Fallon. Woody's return was subsequently covered by several international news outlets including CNN.

Major stores
Hudson's Bay (151,303 sq ft.)
Old Navy (19,234 sq ft.)
H&M (20,780 sq ft.)
Shoppers Drug Mart (10,773 sq ft.)
Decathlon (33,046 sq ft.)
LinenChest (17,466 sq ft.) 
Chapters (25,752 sq ft.) * Free Standing 
Urban Planet (16,989 sq ft.)
Winners (25,976 sq ft.)

Former major stores
 Eaton's - Opened October 13th 1973 as a single level store. Closed in 1997 as part of six store closures by the chain that year due to Eaton's ongoing financial difficulty. 
 Simpsons - Opened 1973 as a single level 90,000 sq ft store. Simpsons was purchased by the Hudson's Bay Company (HBC) in 1978. In 1981, HBC renovated and expanded the Simpsons store to two levels. Converted  to Hudson's Bay (The Bay) in August 1986 as HBC decided to focus Simpsons in the metro Toronto and Montreal markets. 
 Zellers - Former Eaton's - Opened 1999 rebuilt as a two level store and mall expansion. This Zellers location was the only two level store in the Maritimes having replaced two smaller locations. Closed in 2013 as part of lease sale to Target by HBC
 Target - Former Zellers - Opened Fall 2013 - Closed 2015 as part of liquidation of Target Canada assets. Space has been redeveloped into several retailers.
 Toys "R" Us - Opened 1994 only location in Nova Scotia - Relocated to a nearby shopping center, Dartmouth Crossing in 2012.
 Forever 21 - Former Toys "R" Us - Closed 2019 and replaced with Decathlon
 Dominion - Opened 1974. Later converted to IGA, which closed in 2004 and was replaced with a Winners/HomeSense.
 HomeSense - Opened 2005 paired with Winners.  Separated from Winners and Relocated to a stand alone store in Dartmouth Crossing May 2020.
 Future Shop - Opened in the 1980s as a free standing store along with Chapters, Starbucks and Kent. In June 2008 it was relocated to a free standing store in Dartmouth Crossing (formerly HomeSense which closed early 2015 due to liquidation).

Transit terminal 
Mic Mac Mall is home to the Micmac Terminal, a major hub for Halifax Transit buses. It is served by the following routes:

 10 Dalhousie
 54 Montebello
 55 Port Wallace
 56 Dartmouth Crossing
 67 Baker
 72 Portland Hills

See also
 List of largest shopping malls in Canada
 List of shopping malls in Canada

References

External links

 

1973 establishments in Canada
Dartmouth, Nova Scotia
Shopping malls in Halifax, Nova Scotia
Shopping malls established in 1973
Tourist attractions in Halifax County, Nova Scotia